Reinhold Svensson (December 20, 1919 in Husum – November 23, 1968 in Stockholm) was a Swedish jazz pianist, Hammond organist and composer.

Svensson recorded as a solo artist in 1941-1942, then joined the ensemble of violinist Hasse Kahn. In 1948, Putte Wickman took leadership of the group, and Svensson worked with it until 1960 as a performer, arranger, and composer.

Svensson appeared at the Paris Jazz Festival in 1949, worked with Arne Domnerus's orchestra, and played with Charlie Norman in 1950-1951 as a duo under the names Ralph & Bert Berg and the Olson Brothers. He also recorded with his own ensembles (including under the name Ragtime Reinhold); Domnerus, Jack Noren, Simon Brehm, and Thore Jederby were sidemen of his in the late 1940s and early 1950s.

References
"Reinhold Svensson". The New Grove Dictionary of Jazz. 2nd edition, ed. Barry Kernfeld.

Swedish jazz pianists
Swedish composers
Swedish male composers
1919 births
1968 deaths
Male pianists
20th-century pianists
20th-century Swedish male musicians
20th-century Swedish musicians
Male jazz musicians